Clifford's Really Big Movie is a 2004 American animated adventure comedy film based on the PBS Kids TV series Clifford the Big Red Dog, itself an adaptation of the book series of the same name by Norman Bridwell. This film was directed by Robert Ramirez, produced by Scholastic Entertainment and Big Red Dog Productions, and originally released to theaters by Warner Bros. Pictures on February 20, 2004.

The film depicts Clifford joining a traveling animal show known as "Larry's Amazing Animals" with his best friends. Larry Gablegobble (Judge Reinhold), the owner and ringmaster, won't allow animals already owned by others in his show, so they pretend to have false pet tags.

The film takes place on the fictional "Birdwell Island", which the name is inspired by Norman Bridwell, the author of the books. It is one of only two separate films based on a PBS children's property (including Barney's Great Adventure), not counting the two films based on Sesame Street. The film served as John Ritter's final theatrical film role after his unexpected death on September 11, 2003, and it was dedicated to his memory. It also served as the de facto series finale for the television series, as no further episodes were produced following Ritter's death.

The film grossed $3.3 million at the box office, and received mixed overall critical reviews.

Plot
The film begins in Birdwell Island, while Emily Elizabeth calls for Clifford. She hears a rustling in the bushes, and Clifford pops up and rushes toward her. Emily Elizabeth tells Clifford that they are going to be late for a carnival. Clifford is excited and then races away.

Clifford visits the carnival with Emily Elizabeth and her friends, Charley, Jetta, and Clifford's friends, Cleo, and, T-Bone. Clifford, Cleo, and T-Bone are amazed by an animal act known as Larry's Amazing Animals, consisting of Shackelford the High Flying Ferret, Dorothy the High Wire Heifer aka Daring Cow, Dirk the Extreme Dachshund, and Rodrigo, Chihuahua of Steel. However, despite the animals' best efforts, their show is failing due to their respective failed acts, but all remain oblivious of the truth as their owner and the show's host, Larry Gablegobble, expresses his pride towards their efforts. After the show, Larry tells the worrisome carnival owner, P.T., that the only way for their performances to continue is to win a Tummy Yummies Animal Talent Contest, promising fame, fortune, and a lifetime supply of Tummy Yummies. When the trio go to collect their autographs, Shackleford attempts to convince them to join the act, believing Clifford's size and appearance would help revive the group's popularity, but they decline, unwilling to leave their owners.

The next day, Clifford overhears the Howards talking with Mr. Bleakman. He mistakenly believes he is financially burdening the family and decides to join the Amazing Animals, with T-Bone and Cleo joining him. After crossing a perilous seaway and escaping a town afraid of Clifford, the trio finds Larry's animals. Since Larry cannot accept animals with owners, the trio dispose their pet tags, claiming they are to trick dogcatchers. Larry happily welcomes the trio and during their next performance, Clifford manages to save the show, receiving a great round of applause and sparking jealousy from Shackleford. Clifford soon begins to benefit the show as he manages to help the others improve their acts, such as helping Dorothy conquer her acrophobia.  He immediately becomes the star of the show, much to Shackleford's jealousy, believing Clifford has replaced him, and the newspapers are sent to P.T., who is proud of Larry. Meanwhile, Emily Elizabeth discovers Clifford ran away.

Larry's Amazing Animals finally receives entry for the Tummy Yummies contest that will perform the next night. However, when Clifford goes to find Shackleford and reveals the news, Shackleford reveals his jealousy towards Clifford, believing they are all better off without him. Hurt by Shackleford's words and missing Emily Elizabeth, Clifford decides to leave early and return home to Birdwell Island to reunite with Emily Elizabeth. Cleo and T-Bone join him, but manage to convince Clifford to return, and consequently, they save Larry and the others from their broken-down bus, making it to the contest. Larry's Amazing Animals wins, but the CEO of Tummy Yummies, George Wolfsbottom, tricks Larry into signing a contract giving him full custody of Clifford, and kidnaps him for his spoiled daughter Madison.

At a hotel, Shackleford tries to convince everyone Clifford just wanted the Tummy Yummies, prompting Cleo to expose his true intentions. Shackleford realizes he was wrong about him and shows the tags to Larry, who contacts Emily Elizabeth. Larry drives the animals to Wolfsbottom's mansion. While Larry talks to a security guard, the animals infiltrate the mansion and Shackleford breaks Clifford out of his cage. Shackleford apologizes to Clifford for being jealous, but T-Bone accidentally sets off the alarm and Wolfsbottom's security guards try to capture the animals. The group narrowly escapes from the security guards and Emily Elizabeth arrives in time to claim Clifford before Wolfsbottom can get him. Wolfsbottom refuses to let her keep Clifford, showing his contract, but Madison, having a change of heart, convinces her father to release Clifford. Wolfsbottom complies and allows Clifford to go to Birdwell Island where he truly belongs and even provides Clifford the lifetime supply of Tummy Yummies, solving the problem the Howards were dealing with earlier. The trio bid the Amazing Animals a farewell and Clifford reconciles with Shackleford. The film ends with Clifford, Emily Elizabeth, Cleo and T-Bone returning home and moving on with their lives.

Cast
 John Ritter as Clifford, an enormous red Labrador Retriever who joins a travelling animal show named "Larry's Amazing Animals" along with his two friends, T-Bone and Cleo.
 Wayne Brady as Shackelford, a blue ferret in the animal show.
 Grey DeLisle as Emily Elizabeth Howard, Clifford's owner.
 DeLisle also voices Caroline Howard, Emily Elizabeth's mother.
 Jenna Elfman as Dorothy, a cow in the animal show.
 John Goodman as George Wolfsbottom, the founder and CEO of "Tummy Yummies", a dog food brand.
 Judge Reinhold as Larry Gablegobble, the ringmaster and namesake of "Larry's Amazing Animals”.
 Jess Harnell as Dirk, a dachshund in the animal show.
 Kel Mitchell as T-Bone, a yellow male bulldog who joins the animal show, along with Clifford and Cleo.
 Nick Jameson as Sheriff Lewis, T-Bone's owner.
 Kath Soucie as Madison Wolfsbottom, Wolfsbottom's daughter.
Soucie also voices Jetta Handover, one of Emily Elizabeth's friends.
 Oren Williams as Charley, one of Emily Elizabeth's friends.
 Cree Summer as Cleo, a purple female poodle who is one of Clifford's friends who joins the animal show along with Clifford and T-Bone. 
 Summer also voices Ms. Diller, Cleo's owner.
 Wilmer Valderrama as Rodrigo, a chihuahua who is in the animal show.
 Cam Clarke as Mark Howard, Emily Elizabeth's father.
 Earl Boen as Horace Bleakman, Emily Elizabeth's neighbor.
 Ernie Hudson as P.T., the carnival owner, and another friend of Larry.

Production 
The film marked John Ritter's last film role after his death on September 11, 2003, several months before its release, though he had fully completed his voice work for the project during the summer hiatus from his sitcom 8 Simple Rules. The film was dedicated in his memory. It has no continuity with the later live-action 2021 film produced and distributed by Paramount as it is more accurate to the books by Norman Bridwell in comparison.

Clifford's Really Big Movie was the last Warner Bros. Pictures film to utilize hand-drawn/traditional animation until 2018's Teen Titans Go! To the Movies.

Home media
The film was released on DVD and VHS on August 24, 2004 by Warner Home Video. In September 2015, it was re-released by Universal Pictures Home Entertainment.

Soundtrack

Jody Gray composed the score for the film. The soundtrack was released by Warner Bros. Records on the same day that the film had released.

Songs from soundtrack
 "Until I Go" – Kyle Gordon
 "Party Time" – Jody Gray
 "I'm Not Scared Anymore" – Renee Cologne
 "You and Me" – Jody Gray
 "Big Time" – Jody Gray
 "Larry's Amazing Animals" – Jody Gray
 "Until I Go" (Reprise) – Laura Berman
 "Home Where I Belong" – Romaine Jones

Reception

Critical reception
The film received mixed reviews. On review aggregation website, Rotten Tomatoes, the film has an approval rating of 53% based on 32 reviews, with an average rating of 5.7/10. The site's critical consensus reads, "While a dull affair for parents, Clifford's Really Big Movie should charm its intended preschool audience." On Metacritic, which assigns a normalized rating to on reviews, the film has a score of 49 out of 100, based on 15 critics, indicating "mixed or average reviews".

Anna Smith of Empire Magazine, gave the film a three out of five stars, stating: "The humour, though, is aimed squarely at the under-tens, so the rest of us will find it a bit bland. Bland, but wholesome - in a very inoffensive, family-friendly way." Peter Bradshaw of The Guardian, gave the film a two out of five stars, saying: "Easygoing and amiable, it is none the less dull compared to the brilliant new players on the scene. The way to challenge them is with an extra-good script and storyline, and this one doesn't exactly stand out." Solan Freer of RadioTimes, also gave the film a two out of five stars, saying: "With its unsophisticated plot and flat, simplistic animation, this is an undemanding film with no appeal beyond its target audience. Entirely unsuitable for the cinema, it's best watched at home, where little ones will most appreciate its bouncy, sunny style and gaudy block colouring." Common Sense Media rated the film a 3 out of 5 stars, stating "Charming and harmless. Nap while your kid enjoys."

References

External links

 
 

2004 films
2004 animated films
American children's animated adventure films
American children's animated fantasy films
American television series finales
Animated films about dogs
Animated films about animals
Animated films about friendship
Films about giants
Animated films based on animated series
Animated films based on children's books
2000s American animated films
Warner Bros. animated films
Films with screenplays by Rhett Reese
Warner Bros. films
2000s children's animated films
Clifford the Big Red Dog
2000s English-language films